Thomas Schmidt (born 18 February 1976, in Bad Kreuznach) is a German slalom canoeist who competed at the international level from 1994 to 2004.

Competing in two Summer Olympics, he won a gold medal in the K1 event in Sydney in 2000. Schmidt also won two medals in the K1 team event at the ICF Canoe Slalom World Championships with a gold in 2002 and a bronze in 2003.

He is the overall World Cup champion in K1 from 2001. He also won three gold medals in the K1 team event at the European Championships.

World Cup individual podiums

References

External links
 

1976 births
Canoeists at the 2000 Summer Olympics
Canoeists at the 2004 Summer Olympics
German male canoeists
Living people
Olympic canoeists of Germany
Olympic gold medalists for Germany
People from Bad Kreuznach
Olympic medalists in canoeing
Sportspeople from Rhineland-Palatinate
Medalists at the 2000 Summer Olympics
Medalists at the ICF Canoe Slalom World Championships